Ayman El Hassouni (born 22 February 1995) is a Moroccan footballer who plays for Wydad AC as a winger.

International career
He made his debut for the Morocco national football team on 1 December 2021 in a 2021 FIFA Arab Cup game against Palestine.

Honours

Club

Wydad AC
Botola: 2014–15, 2016–17, 2018–19, 2020–21, 2021–22
CAF Champions League:  2021–22
CAF Super Cup: 2018

References

External links

1995 births
Living people
Moroccan footballers
Footballers from Casablanca
Wydad AC players
Botola players
Morocco international footballers
Morocco under-20 international footballers
Association football wingers